Citizens' Assembly on Electoral Reform may refer to:

 Citizens' Assembly on Electoral Reform (British Columbia)
 Citizens' Assembly on Electoral Reform (Ontario)